Brian D. Sisley (January 18, 1964 – January 31, 2013) was an American football defensive end. He played for the New York Giants in 1987 and appeared in three games. One of the NFL's replacement players during the players strike, he had previously played college football for the South Dakota State Jackrabbits. He died in 2013, at the age of 49.

References 

1964 births
2013 deaths
Players of American football from Arkansas
American football defensive ends
South Dakota State Jackrabbits football players
New York Giants players